Olímpico Peruano is a Peruvian football club, playing in the city of Santiago, Ica, Peru.

Honours

National
Liga Departamental de Ica: 0
 Runner-up (1): 2009

Liga Provincial de Ica: 0
 Runner-up (1): 2009

Liga Distrital de Santiago: 1
 2009
 Runner-up (1): 2008

See also
List of football clubs in Peru
Peruvian football league system

External links
Official Web

Football clubs in Peru
Association football clubs established in 1945